During the 2019–20 season, Fortuna Sittard participated in the Eredivisie and the KNVB Cup. The season covers the period from 1 July 2019 to 30 June 2020.

Squad

Squad information

Out on loan

Transfers

In

Out

Pre-season and friendlies

Competitions

Overview

Eredivisie

League table

Results summary

Results by round

Matches
The Eredivisie schedule was announced on 14 June 2019. The 2019–20 season was abandoned on 24 April 2020, due to the coronavirus pandemic in the Netherlands.

KNVB Cup

References

External links

Dutch football clubs 2019–20 season
Fortuna Sittard seasons